Jarlsberg Avis is a local newspaper published in Holmestrand, Norway.

History and profile
Jarlsberg Avis was established in 1843. The paper is owned by Østlands-Posten, which in turn is owned 100% by A-pressen.

In 2006 Jarlsberg Avis had a circulation of 3,647 copies of which 3,499 were through subscription. The paper had a circulation of 3,982 copies in 2013.

References

Norwegian Media Registry

External links
Website

1843 establishments in Norway
Publications established in 1843
Newspapers published in Norway
Norwegian-language newspapers
Mass media in Vestfold
Holmestrand
Amedia